The Ozama River is a river in the Dominican Republic. It rises in the Loma Siete Cabezas mountain in the Sierra de Yamasá mountain range, close to the town of Villa Altagracia.

History
In 1498, Bartolome Colon had a fort built on the Ozama River delta, which would later become the first permanent European settlement in the New World (Santo Domingo).  The estuary at that time, "teemed with fish and where the Indians raised cassava and yams," according to Floyd.

Course

The river flows  before emptying into the Caribbean Sea. At the end of the journey it bisects the capital, Santo Domingo, into eastern and western halves. The three main tributaries of the Ozama are the Isabela River, the Sabita River and the Yabacao River.

The Ozama's basin is the fourth largest in the Dominican Republic.

Pollution
The Ozama River is heavily polluted. It is constantly affected by the slums on its shores and the factories that dump their waste into it. It is one of the main causes of pollution on the coastline of Santo Domingo. In August 2020, The Ocean Cleanup organization deployed an Interceptor Original, one of their solar-powered, automated systems, to help combat the flow of plastics and trash into the Caribbean Sea.

See also
Port of Santo Domingo

References

Rivers of the Dominican Republic
Geography of Santo Domingo
Geography of Santo Domingo Province